The Ngari Capes Marine Park is a marine protected area on the lower south west coast of Western Australia, located approximately  south of .

Features

The park includes a significant number of sanctuary, surfing, shore-based activity and recreation zones.

The largest sanctuary  zones are East Geographe, Eagle Bay, Cape Naturaliste, Injidup, Cape Freycinet, Cape Leeuwin and East Flinders Bay. From the north to the south, some of the special sanctuary zones within the park are East Geographe, Central Geographe Bay, Eagle Bay, Eagle Bay Special Purpose Zone (shore-based activities), Cape Naturaliste, and Windmills Special Purpose Zone (SPZ) (surfing).

Named zones 

Named zones in the park, (SPZ meaning Special Purpose Zone, usually surfing) from the north:

 East Geographe Bay Sanctuary Zone
 Busselton Jetty Sanctuary Zone
 Central Geographe Bay Sanctuary Zone
 Eagle Bay Sanctuary and Special purpose zones
 Cape Naturaliste Sanctuary zone
 Windmills SPZ  (Special Purpose zone)
 Three Bears SPZ
 Yallingup SPZ and Sanctuary zones
 Wyadup Sanctuary Zone (also known as Wyadup rocks, Wyadup beach, and Wyadup bay)
 Injidup Sanctuary Zone (adjacent to Cape Clairault)
 Moses Rock SPZ
 Goannas SPZ
 Moses Beach SPZ
 Gallows/Guillotine SPZ
 Cowaramup Bay Recreation zone
 Lefthanders SPZ
 Kilcarnup Sanctuary Zone
 Margaret River SPZ
 Redgate SPZ
 Cape Freycinet Sanctuary zone
 Hamelin Bay Recreation and Sanctuary zones
 Cosy Corner SPZ and Sanctuary zones
 Cape Leeuwin Sanctuary Zone
 Flinders Island Sanctuary Zone
 East Flinders Bay Sanctuary Zone

See also

 Integrated Marine and Coastal Regionalisation of Australia
 Protected areas of Western Australia
 Surfing locations in the Capes region of South West Western Australia

References

External links

 
Marine parks of Western Australia